Через все времена (Through All Times) is the twelfth studio album by Russian heavy metal band Ария (Aria), released on 25 November 2014.

Track listing

Clips
Point of No Return (2015)

Personnel

Aria
Mikhail Zhitnyakov – vocals
Vladimir Holstinin – guitar
Sergey Popov – guitar
Vitaly Dubinin – bass
Maxim Udalov – drums

Others
Vasily Filatov – producer, mixing, mastering
Margarita Pushkina – lyrics 
Igor Lobanov – lyrics, cover art
Alexander Yelin – lyrics

References

Aria (band) albums